Jakob Kalle (9 April 1896 Kolga Parish (now Kuusalu Parish), Kreis Harrien – 20 April 1942 Sevurallag, Sverdlovsk Oblast) was an Estonian politician. He was a member of VI Riigikogu (its Chamber of Deputies).

References

1896 births
1942 deaths
People from Kuusalu Parish
People from Kreis Harrien
Patriotic League (Estonia) politicians
Members of the Estonian National Assembly
Members of the Riigivolikogu
Estonian people executed by the Soviet Union